Caleana granitica, commonly known as the granite duck orchid is a species of orchid that is endemic to the south-west of Western Australia. It is a species of duck orchid with a single smooth leaf and a single greenish yellow and red flower with the labellum held below the horizontal. It grows on a single granite outcrop near Armadale.

Description 
The leaf is usually withered by flowering time. The dorsal sepal, lateral sepals and petals are narrow and hang downwards with the dorsal sepal pressed against the column which has broad wings, forming a bucket-like shape. The labellum has a flattened top and is held below horizontal with one-half to one-third of its outer part covered with glossy black glands or calli. Flowering occurs from October to early December.

Taxonomy and naming 
The granite duck orchid was first formally described in 2006 by Stephen Hopper and Andrew Brown who gave it the name Paracaleana granitica and published the description in Australian Systematic Botany. In 2014, based on molecular studies, Joseph Miller and Mark Clements transferred all the species previously in Paracaleana to Caleana so that the present species became Caleana granitica. The specific epithet (granitica) refers to the granite outcrop where this orchid grows.

Distribution and habitat 
Caleana granitica grows with mosses and lichens on a granite outcrop south of Armadale in the Jarrah Forest biogeographic region.

Conservation
Caleana granitica (as Paracaleana granitica) is classified as "Priority One" by the Government of Western Australia Department of Parks and Wildlife, meaning that it is known from only one or a few locations which are potentially at risk.

References 

granitica
Orchids of Western Australia
Endemic orchids of Australia
Plants described in 2006
Endemic flora of Western Australia